New York Sketch Book is a piano trio album recorded by jazz pianist Toshiko Akiyoshi.  It was recorded in New York and released by Nippon Crown Records in 2004.

Track listing
"Five Spot After Dark" – 4:29
"52nd Street Theme" – 4:56
"Skating in Central Park" – 7:52
"Uptown Stroll" – 5:45
"Drop Me Off in Harlem" – 7:01
"New York State of Mind" – 5:09
"Central Park West" – 5:13
"Lady Liberty" – 5:33
"Take Me Out to the Ball Game" – 4:31

Personnel
Toshiko Akiyoshi – piano
Kenny Washington – drums
Peter Washington – bass

References / external links
Nippon Crown Records CRCJ-9159

Toshiko Akiyoshi albums
2004 albums